Zborowski (feminine Zborowska, plural Zborowscy) is a Polish surname. It may refer to:
 Andriy Zborovskyi (born 1986), Ukrainian footballer
 Eliot Zborowski (1858–1903), American racing driver
 Helmut Zborowski (1905–1969), Austrian aircraft designer
 Jan Zborowski (1538–1603), Polish Court Hetman
 Jerzy Zborowski (1922–1944), Polish resistance fighter
 Krzysztof Zborowski (died 1593), Polish Royal Deputy cup-bearer
 Leopold Zborowski (1889–1932), Polish poet
 Louis Zborowski (1895–1924), English racing driver
 Marcin Zborowski (c. 1495–1565), Polish castellan
 Mark Zborowski (1908–1990), Soviet-Jewish KGB agent
 Piotr Zborowski (died 1580), Polish voivode
 Samuel Zborowski (died 1584), Polish noble, famous for his execution
 Wiktor Zborowski (born 1951), Polish actor

See also
 
 

Polish-language surnames